In the state of Western Australia, gold is the third largest commodity sector, behind iron ore and LNG, with a value of A$17 billion in 2021–22. The 6.9 million troy ounces (214 tonnes) sold during this time period was the highest amount in 20 years and accounted for almost 70 percent of all gold sold in Australia. Western Australia, in 2021–22, produced 69 percent of all gold produced in Australia, with the country accounting for ten percent of the world's gold production in this time period.

In 2021–22, Western Australian gold mining employed 36,087 people.

During 2021–22, the gold price reached a new record peak of over US$2000 per ounce in early 2022, before settling lower again.



List of active mines
This is a list of major active gold mines in Western Australia in 2020–21, according to the Department of Mines, Industry Regulation and Safety. To qualify for the department's official list of principal mining projects an operation has to either had mineral sales valued at more than $5 million (or more than 2,500 oz of gold), or, for operations where such figures are not reported, had a minimum of 50 employees:

Notes

 Some companies work on calendar year (2021) (mostly non-Australian companies), others on fiscal year (2020–21)
 Also produced 14,000 tonnes of copper in 2021–22
 Production figure is for the combined Mount Monger Operations, which consist of the Daisy Milano and Mount Belches underground and Aldiss open pit operations.
 Production figure is for the combined Yandal Production Centre, which consists of Bronzewing and Jundee Gold Mine. The Bronzewing mine remained in care and maintenance during the 2019 to 2021 period. The Thunderbox Gold Mine was also added to the Yandal operations during that time period but production figures were reported separately.
 Production at the mine temporarily resumed in 2021–22 for trial mining.
 Formerly called Tarmoola Gold Mine.
 Edna May Gold Mine operation includes the Marda & Tampia Gold Mines, from where ore is hauled to and processed at Edna May
 Production figure is for the combined Northern Star Resources Kalgoorlie Operations, which consist of the South Kalgoorlie Gold Mine and Kanowna Belle Gold Mine. The Kundana Gold Mine and the East Kundana Joint Venture (51 percent Northern Star Resources ownership) were also part of the Kalgoorlie Operations until sold in July 2021.
 Mount Magnet Gold Mine operation includes the Vivien Gold Mine, from where ore is hauled to and processed at Mount Magnet
 Combined result for the Murchison Operations consisted of the Meekatharra Gold Operation and the Cue Gold Operation. The Meekatharra Gold Operation consists of the Paddy’s Flat, South Emu-Triton and Bluebird underground mines and the surface operations at Five Mile Well, Maid Marion, Albury Heath and Aladdin open pits. The Cue Gold Operation consists of the Big Bell underground mine as its primary producer, supplemented by the Comet underground mine.
 The Duketon Gold Project consists of the Duketon South Operations, comprising the Garden Well and Rosemont processing facilities, and the Duketon North Operations, comprising the Moolart Well processing facility
 Also produced 84 million pounds (38,000 tonnes) of copper in 2022
 Combined production for the Mungari Operation, which consist of the Frog's Leg Gold Mine and the White Foil Gold Mine. Additionally to this, the Kundana and East Kundana underground operations were added to the Mungari Operation in 2021
 Achieved from trial mining and subsequent treatment at the third-party Lakewood processing plant
 Ore toll-treated at the St Barbara Limited Gwalia processing plant

List of mines in care and maintenance
This is a list of gold mines in Western Australia that are currently under care and maintenance, with an existing process plant registered on their relevant MINEDEX entry:

Notes

 Some companies work on Calendar year (2008) (mostly non-Australian companies), others on Fiscal year (2008–09)

See also

Gold mining in Western Australia
Regions of Western Australia
Mineral fields of Western Australia

References

External links 
 Department of Mines, Industry Regulation and Safety
 MINEDEX website Database of the Department of Mines, Industry Regulation and Safety

Western Australia-related lists
Lists of mines in Australia
Western Australia